Longtou (龙头) may refer to the following locations in China:

Towns
 Longtou, Guangdong
 Longtou, Liucheng County, Guangxi
 Longtou, Heilongjiang
 Longtou, Shaanxi, in Chenggu County
 Longtou, Sichuan, in Changning County

Townships
 Longtou Township, Fusui County, Guangxi
 Longtou Township, Yizhou, Guangxi